Rebecca of Sunnybrook Farm is a 1938 American musical comedy film directed by Allan Dwan, and written by Don Ettlinger, Karl Tunberg, Ben Markson and William M. Conselman, the third adaptation of Kate Douglas Wiggin's 1903 novel of the same name (previously done in 1917 and 1932).

Starring Shirley Temple, Randolph Scott, Jack Haley, Gloria Stuart, Phyllis Brooks, Helen Westley, Slim Summerville and Bill Robinson, it is the second of three films in which Temple and Scott appeared together, between To the Last Man (1933) and Susannah of the Mounties (1939). The plot tells of a talented orphan's trials and tribulations after winning a radio audition to represent a breakfast cereal.

Plot
Rebecca and her step-father, Harry, attend a singing contest to find "Miss America" in order to represent a cereal company in an advertising campaign. 

While Rebecca sings, the advertising executive, Tony Kent, and the head of the cereal company listen to the contest on the radio, and fall in love with her voice.  From his office, Tony tells his assistant, Orville, that he's heard enough [contestants]. Misunderstanding his meaning, Orville sends Rebecca and Harry away. 

Angered by Orville's error, Tony tells Orville to find Rebecca, but she and Harry have already left the building. Harry then takes Rebecca to live with Rebecca's aunt, Miranda, on Sunnybrook Farm because they have, yet again, been kicked out of their apartment for non-payment of rent.

Rebecca meets her Aunt Miranda and cousin Gwen at Sunnybrook and decides she loves the farm and never wants to leave. One day, she meets a new neighbor, who happens to be Tony Kent, but they had never met in person so neither knows the other. 

Tony and Gwen seem to have chemistry, but Tony is seeing a singer, Lola Lee. Rebecca and Tony become fast friends and she visits him one day where they have lunch. Gwen stops by and during the visit, Tony's assistant Orville also stops in. Gwen plays the piano while Rebecca sings and Orville recognizes her voice and excitedly tells Tony that's the girl, so the cereal campaign is saved. 

Aunt Miranda is against Rebecca singing on the radio, and forbids Rebecca from doing so.  Rebecca and cousin Gwen devise a plan to do the transmission from Tony's home instead of the city.

Lola Lee visits Tony and realizes he has feeling for Gwen but is persuaded by Orville that Tony doesn't have the feelings for her that he does. Tony's butler, Homer, who is a former beau of Aunt Miranda, assists Rebecca in climbing from her second story bedroom but knocks the ladder over when he tries to climb down, forcing him to stay in Rebecca's room.  

Aunt Miranda hears the broadcast and thinks the little girl sounds much like Rebecca but believes Rebecca is in her room. When Homer falls over by rocking too hard in a rocking chair, Aunt Miranda discovers him in the bedroom. Homer begs her forgiveness for missing their wedding 25 years earlier. She forgives him and allows Rebecca to continue to sing but takes her straight home afterwards. 

Harry and his new wife hear Rebecca singing on the radio and he gets a lawyer involved to again claim guardianship over Rebecca so they can get rich. He forces Aunt Miranda to give up Rebecca, and devises to sell her singing contract to a rival company of Tony's.  

Tony and Gwen find Rebecca at the local broadcast station, and attempt to buy Rebecca's contract but the executive refuses. When Rebecca tries to sing, her voice fails her and a doctor is called. He says she has laryngitis and needs a year or more rest and she'll be good as new. The ad exec rips up the contract he had with Harry. Tony then offers Harry $5000 to turn over his legal guardianship to Rebecca's aunt. Harry agrees and after they leave, Rebecca shows she was merely pretending and her voice is fine.  

The movie ends with Gwen and Tony, Lola Lee and Orville, and Miranda and Homer being couples, and Rebecca performs a military dance show on the stage.

Cast
 Shirley Temple as Rebecca Winstead, a young orphan
 Randolph Scott as Tony Kent, a radio advertising executive
 William Demarest as Harry Kipper, Rebecca's stepfather
 Helen Westley as Miranda, a farm woman and Rebecca's aunt
 Gloria Stuart as Gwen, Rebecca's cousin and Kent's romantic interest
 Bill "Bojangles" Robinson as Aloysius, Miranda's farm hand
 Slim Summerville as Homer Busby, Miranda's old sweetheart
 Jack Haley as Orville Smithers, a radio performer
 Phyllis Brooks as Lola Lee, a radio performer
 Alan Dinehart as Purvis, Kent's competitor
 Franklin Pangborn as an organist at a radio station
 Paul Hurst as Florabelle's Father
 Mary McCarty as Florabelle

Production
This movie is notable as the first movie in which Temple's mother did away with the trademark 56 curls for which Temple became famous. The new style with the long loose waves combed back was modeled to look closer to that of Mary Pickford, whom Temple's mother admired.

In the preparation for the film's finale (the "Toy Trumpet" dance number), Robinson joined Temple and her mother at the Desert Inn in Palm Springs to begin rehearsals. It was here that Temple had her first real encounter with the racism endured by Robinson, as he was forced to sleep in the chauffeurs' quarters as opposed to the cottages reserved for white guests.

At one point, preparations were made to include a drum sequence in the movie where Temple would play on the drums along with the musicians on the set. Temple befriended the studio drummer Johnny Williams, who taught her how to play the drums. Dwan, noticing her aptitude for the instrument, immediately ordered another drum set for her. Temple's mother, however, was strongly opposed to it, believing her sitting with legs apart was unladylike. The resulting sequence was later dropped, much to Temple's chagrin.

Temple's brother Jack Temple was hired as the movie's 3rd assistant director, to which as Shirley Temple would later say, he "spent time thinking up things to take care of, one of which was me." He was subsequently fired after he and Shirley Temple got into a dispute over a roasted turkey prop on the set. The turkey had been sprayed with insecticide to discourage insects, and her brother loudly ordered her not to eat the turkey, which she had no intention of doing. Out of spite, she popped the turkey in her mouth, prompting her brother to shake her to dislodge it. The spat did not sit well with the director Dwan, who ordered him off the set.

Soundtrack
 Happy Endings
 Music by Lew Pollack
 Lyrics by Sidney D. Mitchell
 Sung by Phyllis Brooks

 You've Gotta Eat Your Spinach, Baby
 Music by Harry Revel
 Lyrics by Mack Gordon
 Sung by Mary McCarty

 An Old Straw Hat
 Music by Harry Revel
 Lyrics by Mack Gordon
 Sung by Shirley Temple

 Crackly Grain Flakes
 Music by Lew Pollack
 Lyrics by Sidney D. Mitchell
 Sung by Quartet

 Alone with You
 Music by Lew Pollack
 Lyrics by Sidney D. Mitchell
 Sung by Phyllis Brooks and Jack Haley

 On the Good Ship Lollipop
 Music by Richard A. Whiting
 Lyrics by Sidney Clare
 Sung as part of a medley by Shirley Temple

 Animal Crackers in My Soup
 Music by Ray Henderson
 Lyrics by Ted Koehler and Irving Caesar
 Sung as part of a medley by Shirley Temple

 When I'm with You
 Music by Harry Revel
 Lyrics by Mack Gordon
 Sung as part of a medley by Shirley Temple

 Oh My Goodness
 Music by Harry Revel
 Lyrics by Mack Gordon
 Sung as part of a medley by Shirley Temple

 Goodnight My Love
 Music by Harry Revel
 Lyrics by Mack Gordon
 Sung as part of a medley by Shirley Temple

 Parade of the Wooden Soldiers
 Music by Leon Jessel
 English lyrics by Ballard MacDonald
 Arranged by Raymond Scott
 Sung by Shirley Temple and the Raymond Scott and His Quintet with Men's Chorus
 Danced by Temple and Bill Robinson

 The Toy Trumpet
 Music by Raymond Scott
 Lyrics by Sidney D. Mitchell and Lew Pollack

Release

Critical reception
Variety wrote, "The national No. 1 box office star has seldom shone so brilliantly in her singing, dancing and repartee.  That means she is going right ahead to bigger and better grosses."

Accolades
The film is recognized by American Film Institute in these lists:
 2006: AFI's Greatest Movie Musicals – Nominated

Home media
In 2009, the film was available on videocassette and DVD in the black and white original and computer-colorized versions.  Some editions had special features and theatrical trailers.

See also
 Shirley Temple filmography

References

External links 
 
 
 
 

1938 films
American black-and-white films
Films based on children's books
Films directed by Allan Dwan
20th Century Fox films
1938 musical comedy films
Musical film remakes
Films produced by Darryl F. Zanuck
Films based on works by Kate Douglas Wiggin
American musical comedy films
1930s English-language films
1930s American films